The Nepal women's national under-20 football team is the age at U-20 female that represents women's football of Nepal. They plays SAFF U-18 Women's Championship, and AFC U-19 Women's Championship. The team yet to qualified FIFA U-20 Women's World Cup.

Recent results and fixtures
Results accurate up to 6 March 2019.

* Nepal score always listed first

2023

Current Staff

Current squad
The following players were called up for the 2019 AFC U-19 Women's Championship qualification

Competitive record

AFC U-19 Women's Championship

SAFF U-18 Women's Championship

References

u20
Asian women's national under-20 association football teams